Jah Cure, or Iyah Cure (born Siccature Alcock on 11 October 1978 in Hanover, Jamaica) is a Jamaican reggae musician. Raised in Kingston, he was given the name Jah Cure by Capleton.

Career
His first big break came in March 1997 when he released the single "King in this Jungle" which was a duet with Sizzla. The single was produced by Beres Hammond who went on to become his mentor. He then released several singles that received critical and popular acclaim. Beres Hammond eventually took Cure under his tutelage and began mentoring him and producing his music in the studio. In 1998, Cure performed on a European tour and visited several Caribbean Islands with Beres Hammond and the Harmony House Family.

Cure released three albums and a number of singles from prison, some of which have topped the Jamaican chart. His first album Free Jah's Cure The Album the Truth was released in 2000, it was followed by Ghetto Life in 2003 and Freedom Blues in 2005. More recently Cure has released the songs "Love Is", "Longing For" and "True Reflections", showing his unique voice and lyrical ability. Three days later releasing from the prison, his fourth album, True Reflections...A New Beginning was released.

His first concert after he was released took place in the Netherlands at the Reggae Sundance festival in August 2007. He was the last and headlining act.

He is signed to Iyah Cure Productions and VP Records.

In 2008, Jah Cure released "Hot Long Time" feat. Junior Reid. Universal Cure, Jah Cure's 5th studio album, was to be released on 25 November 2008, but was postponed to a "mid 2009" release. The Universal Cure was released in the US on 14 April 2009. The album features "Hot Long Time" (featuring Junior Reid, Flo Rida, and Mavado.), as well as "Mr. Jailer" and "Journey". The album was the first recorded album since his release from prison.

At the end of 2010, following the success of Jah Cure's single "Unconditional Love" featuring Phyllisia, SoBe Entertainment released the second single off Jah Cure's upcoming World Cry album, titled "Like I See It" featuring Rick Ross and Mavado.

On 11 December 2012, SoBe Entertainment digitally released Jah Cure's 6th studio album, World Cry. The physical release was scheduled for 29 January 2013.

His album The Cure was released in July 2015. It topped the Billboard Reggae Albums chart in its first week of release and was nominated for a Grammy Award for Best Reggae Album in 2016.

His album "Royal Soldier" was released in August 2019 on VP Records. It debuted at number one on the Billboard Reggae Chart. Singles off the album include "Telephone Love", "Risk It All", "Life is Real", "Marijuana" and "Pretty Face".

Legal issues
In November 1998, while driving around Montego Bay, Cure was pulled over by police and arrested on charges of gun possession, robbery and rape. He was prosecuted before the
Gun Court. In April 1999, found guilty and sentenced to 15 years in prison. Cure was transferred from the St. Catherine Adult Correctional Centre to the Tower Street Adult Correctional Centre, which had a digital recording studio the inmates could use. He was released on parole on 28 July 2007, after serving 8 years.

On 1 October 2021 Jah was arrested in Amsterdam after having stabbed a music promoter in the stomach. On 22 March 2022 he was found guilty, and sentenced to 6 years in prison.

Personal life
Jah Cure married TV host & producer Kamila McDonald on 7 August 2011 in Sandy Bay Hanover. Their daughter was born on 20 February 2012, named Kailani Belle which means "Beautiful Chief from the heavens". The couple's divorce was finalized in August 2017.

Discography

References

External links
 
 
 
Jah Cure's MySpace page
Jah Cure Interview
BBC 1Xtra Interview after Reggae Sundance in the Netherlands
 Jah cure interview in French
Jah Cure Brings "The Universal Cure" to the World

1978 births
Living people
Jamaican reggae singers
Reggae fusion artists
Jamaican male singers
People from Hanover Parish
VP Records artists
21st-century Jamaican criminals
People convicted of rape
People convicted of assault
People convicted of robbery
Prisoners and detainees of the Netherlands
Jamaican people imprisoned abroad